Mixtec transnational migration is the phenomenon whereby Mixtec people have migrated between Mexico and the United States, for over three generations.

The Mixtec transnational social experience challenges traditional conceptions of cultural identity (nationhood) linked to geographical location (territory).  They are an example of a social group in which migration had not led to a loss of cultural identity; rather, migration has generated territorial expansion and cultural reaffirmation.

Mixtecs have migrated to various parts of both Mexico and United States. In recent years Mixtecs, along with Zapotecs and Triqui, have emerged as one of the largest groups of migrants in the United States. Large Mixtec communities exist in the border cities of Tijuana, Baja California, and San Diego. According to statistics compiled by the National Geographic and Statistical Institute, out of the 241,080 indigenous people living in the border cities, 72,000 (30 percent) are migrants. As of 2011, an estimated 150,000 Mixteco people were living in California, and 25,000 to 30,000 in New York City.

Migration of indigenous populations to various cities of the United States constitutes an important source of income for the Mixtec, who have a long tradition of migration and are the most numerous in the United States according to the Mixtec Integrated Development Program. The remittances sent between 1984 and 1988 amounted $2,000 million pesos annually. Mixtec communities are generally described as transnational and transborder because of their ability to maintain and reaffirm social ties between their native homeland and diasporic community. For more than two decades, anthropologists have documented people who move from one country to another and who build transnational links.

Transnational migration
It is important, however, to define what transnational means and to distinguish among transnational migrants and immigrants. Nina Glick Schiller   defines transnational as “those persons who having migrated from one nation-state to another live their lives across borders, participating simultaneously in social relations that embed them in more than one nation-state.” Activities and identity claims in the political domain are a particular form of transnational migration that is best understood as long-distance nationalism.

Stephen  states that while the term transnational migration suggests a more or less permanent state of being between two or more locations, some people may spend a good part of their time engaging in this state of being, others may live for longer periods of time in one place or another, and still others may leave their home communities only one time or never. All the people living within a transnational social field are exposed, in different levels, but nonetheless in some shared way to “ a set of social expectations, cultural values, and patterns of human interaction shaped by more than one social, economic and political system”

Transnational social fields
By conceptualizing transnational social fields as transcending the boundaries of nation-states, individuals within these fields are, through their everyday activities and relationships, influenced by multiple sets of laws and institutions that exist within many states and cross their border. The national and the transnational part of migrant histories and experiences, particularly when it comes to the recognition or lack thereof of basic human and labor rights connected to their positions in the relation to the legal frameworks of the nations they are moving between Migrants Rights. When Mixtecs come into the United States, they cross a new set of regional borders that are often different from those in Mexico, but may also overlap with those of Mexico; for example, the racial/ethnic hierarchy of Mexico, which lives on in Mexican communities in the United States. These include ethnic, cultural, and regional borders within the United States.  For these reasons, it makes more sense to speak of transborder migration rather than simply transnational. The transnational becomes a subset of the transborder experience

Background
According to social researcher Laura Velasco-Ortiz (2002), several decades of Mexican migration to the United States have led entire communities to develop economic, cultural and social ties in the US and Mexico concurrently.  Moreover, evidence suggests that these migrant populations have modified the construction of the sense of territorial belonging historically associated as the foundation of local, regional and national identities.  Velasco-Ortiz proposes a reconceptualization between the relation culture-territory in the process of transnational migration among Mixtec communities.

Mixtec sacrality appears as the primary agent of reconciliation between cultural identity and territorial fragmentation. Social researchers agree that the transportation of sacred symbols between transnational Mixtec communities has been a fundamental process for in the maintenance of cultural autonomy. Female concepts of the divine and sacred practices play a crucial role in preserving Mixtec native tradition. Thus, understanding female concepts of sacrality can reveal important aspects about Mixtec negotiation of religious and cultural identities when outside the homelands.

Mixtec identity
The use of ethnic labels has enabled migrant workers to distinguish themselves in local ethnic hierarchies and to differentiate themselves from other Mexicans, Central-Americans, and others. According to Kearny  the use of pan-ethnic labels has also provided a way for so-called illegal or alien Mixtec migrants to construct a new form of identity based on their transborder existence. Mixtec identity arises as an alternative to nationalist consciousness and as a medium to circumscribe not space, but collective identity precisely in those border areas where nationalist boundaries of territory and identity are most contested and ambiguous. Mixtec migrants have continued to be based in their historically marginalized lands in the state of Oaxaca and face an ongoing struggle for their rights as indigenous peoples and immigrant workers and as socially valued citizens of Mexico. However, according to Stephen (2007) culturally Mixtecs and other indigenous migrants of Latin American origin are still not seen as part of the Mexican's state. Indigenous population continues to struggle against the racism imported from Mexico which labels them as inferior to other Mexicans in the United States.

History of indigenous migration
The origin of indigenous migration is tied to the industrialization process in Mexico since the decade of the 1940s and to the rapid transformation of an agriculturally based economy to an urban industrialized economy. This change lowered the level of agricultural production in the indigenous areas that become even more marginal.   Mixtec migration within Mexico, in particular has been tied to the commercialization of Mexican agriculture beginning after World War II. For the past two decades, liberalization of trade barriers between Mexico and United States has made it much easier for U.S. agricultural products to enter Mexico and for Mexican products to enter the United States. According to Melinda Burns  the Mixtecs form part of a de facto border exchange, one in which the U.S. exports cheap corn to Mexico and imports Mexican corn farmers to labor in the fields of California. Nearly two decades of free trade have deepened the poverty and unemployment in Mexico's countryside, studies show. Mexico's three million peasants were simply outgunned by 75,000 farmers in Iowa who with the help of ample rain, state of the art technology, and millions of dollars in government subsidies could produce twice as much corn at half the price. As a consequence many farmers began to leave the countryside.

In most Oaxacan communities underemployment is high during the slack months of the agricultural year. The situation in many communities became quite dire in the 1990s as subsidies and credits for small farmers were significantly downsided. They had to compete with subsidized imported corn and other products that hit the Mexican market as a result of the North American Free Trade Agreement (NAFTA). According to Stephen (2005) indigenous migration became more significant with the recruitment of Oaxacan men by the U.S. bracero program during World War II and after. The Bracero Program was a guestworker program between Mexico and the US, begun because of a perceived labor shortage in the agricultural and railroad industry. Braceros were to work under contracts that specified their transportation, wages, health care, housing, and food and the number of hours to be worked. The contracts were initially between the U.S. and Mexican governments but they were switched to private contractors who ignored the terms. It is estimated that over 4.5 million contracts were issued.  The bracero program ended in 1964, many Oaxacans among them many Mixtecs continued to migrate

Temporary migration of indigenous peoples as agricultural workers to the United States was of great importance. When their participation in the internal migratory networks, which sometimes extend over thousands of miles, has become a significant complementary source of income of the indigenous economy in most regions of the country. The indigenous labor force is critical to the viability of the most important agro-industrial crops. The greatest concentrations of indigenous migrants are in the states of California and Oregon. Stephen (2007) states that we can no longer think of the cultural and historical entity we call Mexico as existing solely below the Rio Grande and the rest of the physical border, in the past they were part of Mexican territory.

The increasing presence of Mexicans in both California and Oregon and their links to Mexico are important parts of the histories of transborder communities. The arrival of Mixtecs first as a part of the bracero program and later as workers brought up by labor contractors is part and parcel of the history of active recruitment of Mexicans as farmworkers beginning in the early part of the twentieth century Oregon has more than 100,000 farm-workers, 98 percent of whom are Latino, primarily of Mexican origin. The most recent farmworkers, many of whom live permanently in Oregon and should be considered immigrants workers, are indigenous. The histories of Mexicans in California and Oregon according to Stephen (2007) are connected to the histories of places such as San Agustin, a Mixtec community in Oaxaca, through political, economic, and cultural connections. These connections have been physically carried in the bodies of people moving back and forth between these places, in the social remittances that the migration experience has brought to the residents of these transborder communities and through the transnational social fields of power linked to the commercial agriculture, U.S. immigration policy and the recruitment of workers.  It is important to point out that not only males from Mixtec communities or Mexico migrate to the United States. Women have played a significant role as transnational migrants as well. Rees  argues that the increase in number of female migrants to the United States is not longer a male strategy to reduce household expenses. “Migration is not solely a male strategy: in spite of low remittances, the number of migrants is positively related to consumer goods. Not all migrants cut themselves off from their families, not all operate solely as free agents or individuals, but remain tied to their household and communities through reciprocal relations”

Migrant life
Indigenous migrant and immigrant workers often try to remain invisible in the larger world to avoid detention and deportation by the U.S. Customs and Border Protection. According to Stephen (2007) migrants are also objects of surveillance and invisibility on the U.S.-Mexico border, the agricultural fields and in produce processing plants. Racialized readings of Mexican indigenous immigrants and migrants as illegal, undocumented or not, result in surveillance from many people in the United States, from border guards to factory supervisors. Being object of surveillance in the United States for your legal status is a contradictory framework because of the encouragement of undocumented immigration through U.S. immigration policy, as Stephen explains “U.S. immigration policy in relation to Mexico and other countries has served primarily as labor policy, inviting workers in when they are needed and then showing them the door when it became politically expedient to “defend” the border.” 

While U.S. immigration policy has consistently maintained the theater of defending the border from what are called illegal aliens, deeper historical analysis of particular policies directed toward Mexico; for example, the bracero program of 1942–64, the IRCA, and the SAW program of 1986  and a close examination of the accelerated integration of the U.S. and Mexican economies under economic neoliberalism and the North American Free Trade Agreement (NAFTA) suggests that U.S. immigration policy toward Mexico has in fact encouraged and facilitated increased immigration 

Undocumented people have played the game of U.S. politics of fear and food: the importance of undocumented people in food production and processing is a major cheap asset for the American economy. According to the Department of Labor, about 53 percent of farmworkers in the United States are undocumented. In California, estimates are as high as 90 percent. While no hard figures are available, it is often estimated that from 50 to 80 percent of those who labor in Oregon's fields are undocumented as well.

The media has created an anti-immigrant message in the United States that portrays Mexicans as illegal aliens who are invading this country and taking away many sources of employment. Especially after the 9/11 terrorist attacks, the immigrant population has been target of racism as Stephen (2007) asserts that what initially was a legal and cultural label (undocumented/illegal Mexican immigrant) became racialized as images of supposed illegal aliens that depicts the loss of control, invasion, danger, and war. Indigenous workers who are continuously read as dark and illegal become subject to treatment that is justified by their appearance. Such treatment includes surveillance because of their presumed or potential illegal/criminal status. Indigenous migrant workers have a strong sense of continually being read as other and different in Oregon and California by non-Mexicans, who have begun to see Mexican immigrants to intensify in numbers 

We need to be able to differentiate or distinguish between potential terrorists and those who come to this country to work and do crucial work of producing our food, provide services, and do the jobs many American citizens would not do. One of the most important developments among indigenous migrants was the formation, in 1991, of the Bi-National Mixtec-Zapotec Front, which has sought the support of the Mexican Government and international donor agencies to improve the respect for human and labor rights   The Frente Indigena de Organizaciones Binacionales (FIOB) has expanded the dialogue on indigenous issues beyond national borders between Mexico and the United States, as well as among Mexico, Guatemala and Belize.  According to Stephen (2007) the FIOB publicly constructs its identity by linking local, regional, national, and transborder or binational dimensions of indigenous identity with a multi-sited understanding of location.

Remittances are an important source of income in developing countries. According to the International Forum on Remittances    “remittances are part of the centuries-old pattern of migration from rural to urban areas. Nowadays, remittances represent the human face of globalization, in which millions of people migrate in search of a better life and in order to provide for their loved ones back home. These flows of human and financial capital have profound implications for the economies and societies of the sending and the receiving countries.”  Mixtec migrants send money back to their country of origin in a variety of ways. Where available, they may use formal channels such as banks and money transfer services. Digital border crossing is often an important dimension of transborder communities, outside of electronic money transfers and the use of ATMs little attention has been paid to how digital communication is entering the lives of transborder migrants in maintaining their family relationships, in cross-border political organizing, solidarity, human rights defense, and in the construction of ethnic identities 

Immigrant uses of digital technologies across borders have been described as “virtual diasporas” by Laguerre  A virtual diaspora is the cyber expansion of real diaspora. No virtual diaspora can be sustained without real life diasporas and in this sense it is not a separate entity, but rather a pole of a continuum  The virtual transborder organizing of the FIOB has matched this profile, first, through email and fax campaigns and second, through its website and print and web-based newsletter, El Tequio. According to Stephen (2007) through their digital productions invoking both the rootedness of place and place based histories and transborder and transhistorical presences, the indigenous activist in FIOB have constituted their own identities of contemporary indigenous Mexican identity

The role of women
Women play a significant role in maintaining Mixtec cultural identity. This is true for Mixtec families who remain in traditional areas, as well as for those who have migrated. Nonetheless, their influence in a transnational context seems to be even stronger. Similar to other immigrant groups, transnational Mixtec communities undergo a process in which they adapt to American society and urban life. For the Mixtec community in Linda Vista, San Diego for example, native families adjust to living in apartment complexes, learn to utilize domestic appliances such as the gas stove and the refrigerator, make use of public transportation, buy their produce at a grocery store, and send their children to American public schools.  However, as much as possible, they seek to reproduce traditional communal life, in part because cohesion is a protection strategy against an unknown and aggressive urban environment (Clark-Alfaro 2003).

In immigrant Mixtec communities, several families can live in one apartment. Usually, there is one family per bedroom, sharing bathroom and kitchen with other relatives. It is common for a Mixtec extended family to include three or more generations the same household: grandparents, parents and grandchildren.

Mixtecs practice a gendered division of labor, in which women are in charge of the house and the children, and men are the breadwinners. However, due to the high cost of living, many Mixtec women in transnational communities are forced to join the labor force either next to the men, working as agricultural laborers in the fields or as domestic workers in the homes of middle and upper class American families.  Despite women's progressively increased participation in salaried work, Mixtec communal tradition still dictates that domestic chores (cooking, cleaning, washing clothes, dishwashing, childcare, healthcare and religiosity) remain woman's work (Maier 2005).

Mixtec female sacrality is reflected in everyday ordinary activities such as cleaning, food preparation, bathing, childcare, parenting and communal interaction, as well as in more formal rituals such as Day of the Dead, Temascalli (vapor) baths, the anniversaries of patron saints, and celebrations of births, baptisms, weddings and funerals. For the Mixtec people, community is the highest expression of divinity (Dahldren De Jordan 1966); therefore, any activity that promotes communal life implies some level of Mixtec sacrality, and it is typically Mixtec women who uphold collective tradition. In the private sphere (the home), women are the primary transmitters of native language: they maintain unity by bringing family together during meals, sharing oral stories about their ancestry and the homelands, teaching Mixtec traditional values to the children, and keeping alive Mixtec customs such as altar display, herbal medicinal healing and hospitality. In the public sphere, Mixtec women play a major role in organizing civic festivities. Women are in charge of preparing traditional feasts during any type of communal celebration. They organize among themselves to decide who will prepare what but also, they participate from logistical arrangements such as decorating, dance performances and religious processions.

Men's responsibilities, on the other hand, are usually limited to their jobs outside the home, and holding on too tightly to their cultural identities can be seen as a form of cultural resistance.  Mixtec women often carry the burdens of a double shift between the workplace and the home, but nevertheless make every effort maintain their traditions and core values alive.  Thus, in a sense, it could be said that transnational Mixtec women are most invested in preserving their culture.

References

Further reading
 Clarck-Alfaro, Victor. Los Mixtecos en la Frontera (Baja California). San Diego, CA: Montezuma Publishing, 2003.
 Dahlgren De Jordan, Barbro. La Mixteca: Su cultura e historia Prehispanicas. Mexico, DF: Universidad Nacional Autonoma de Mexico, 1966.
 Maier, Elizabeth. The Un-settling, Gendered Consequences of Migration for Mexican-Indigenous Women. Tijuana, BC: Colegio de la Frontera Norte, 2005.
 Velasco-Ortiz, Laura. El regreso de la comunidad: migracion indigena y agentes etnicos (los mixtecos en la frontera Mexico-Estados Unidos). Tijuana, BC: El Colegio de la Frontera Norte, 2002.

Culture in Tijuana
Hispanic and Latino American culture in New York City
Indigenous Mexican American culture
Mexican-American culture in San Diego
Mixtec